A Site of Special Scientific Interest or SSSI is a special area to protect wildlife, habitats and geographic features based on scientific interest in Hong Kong. Scientific interests are special features relating to animal life, plant life, geology and/or geography. After being identified by the Agriculture, Fisheries and Conservation Department, these areas are documented by the Planning Department and added to maps. From 1975 to 2005, 67 locations were designated SSSIs throughout Hong Kong.

List of SSSIs

 Yim Tso Ha Egretry 	25/02/75. Delisted in March 2016.
 Shing Mun Fung Shui Woodland 	25/02/75
 Tai Mo Shan Montane Forest Scrub 	15/09/75
 She Shan Fung Shui Woodland 	15/09/75
 Tai Tam Harbour (Inner Bay) 	24/10/75
 D'Aguilar Peninsula 	24/10/75
 Ma On Shan 	23/06/76
 Tsing Shan Tsuen 	23/06/76 (delisted in 2008)
 Sunset Peak 	23/06/76
 Mai Po Marshes 	15/09/76
 Bluff Island & Basalt Island 	16/02/79
 Port Island 	16/02/79
 Kat O Chau 	16/02/79 (De-Designated on 1.3.2006)
 Ninepin Group 	16/02/79
 Ping Chau* 	16/02/79
 Mai Po Village 	16/02/79
 Mau Ping 	16/02/79
 Pak Sha Wan Peninsula 	16/02/79 (De-Designated on 1.8.2006)
 Lai Chi Wo Beach 	16/02/79
 Ng Tung Chai 	16/02/79
 Pak Tai To Yan 	20/09/79
 Chiu Keng Tam 	20/09/79
 Tai Long Bay 	20/09/79
 Pok Fu Lam Reservoir Catchment Area 	20/09/79
 Tai Tam Reservoir Catchment Area 	20/09/79
 Beacon Hill 	20/09/79
 Ho Chung Valley 	20/09/79
 Lung Kwu Chau, Tree Island & Sha Chau 	20/09/79
 Castle Peak 	5/02/80
 Tai Mo Shan 	5/02/80
 Pak Nai 	5/02/80
 Man Cheung Po 	5/02/80
 Lantau Peak 	5/02/80
 Pat Sin Range 	5/02/80
 Fung Yuen Valley 	5/02/80
 South Lamma Island 	5/02/80
 Yim Tin Tsai & Ma Shi Chau* 	24/09/82
 Tolo Channel (Northern Coast)* 	24/09/82
 Centre Island* 	24/09/82
 Nai Chung Coast* 	24/09/82
  	10/01/85
 Ting Kok 	1/03/85
 Sham Chung Coast* 	25/03/85
 A Chau 	9/04/85
 Lai Chi Chong* 	26/04/85
 Inner Deep Bay 	18/03/86
  Egretry 	5/01/89
 Hoi Ha Wan 	5/01/89
 Hok Tsui (Cape D'Aguilar)# 	19/07/90
 Nam Fung Road Woodland 	22/06/93
 Sam Mun Tsai Egretry 	13/08/94 (De-Designated on 10.2.2010)
 Shuen Wan Egretry 	13/08/94
 Tai Po Egretry 	13/08/94
 Lin Ma Hang Lead Mines 	13/08/94
 Tseng Tau Coast 	13/08/94
 Kei Ling Ha Mangal 	13/08/94
 Pok To Yan & Por Kai Shan 	13/08/94
 San Tau Beach 	19/10/94
 Sha Lo Tung 	16/01/97
 Shek O Headland* 	3/02/98
 San Chau, Lantau 	4/05/99
 Ngong Ping, Lantau 	4/05/99
 Tai Ho Stream, Lantau 	5/05/99
 Sham Wan, Lamma Island 	3/06/99
 South Tsing Yi 	13/4/2005
 Tai Om Fung Shui Woodland 	30/12/2005
 Shek Ngau Chau 	30/12/2005
 Lin Ma Hang Stream 6/07/2007
 Siu Lang Shui 8/01/2008
 Deep Water Bay Valley 12/02/2008
 Lung Kwu Tan Valley 03/04/2012
 Sunshine Island 27/02/2015

Note: Sites marked with asterisk (*) indicate designation for geological rather than biological interest. Sites marked with # indicate designation for geological and biological interest.

See also
SSSI, (Site of Special Scientific Interest). A similar terminology being used in United Kingdom, from which the SSSI of Hong Kong originates.
 Zapovednik, similar sites in the former USSR.

References

Further reading
 Leung, Yee-ching, "A study of sites of special scientific interest", Postgraduate Thesis, Master of Science (Environmental Management), University of Hong Kong, 2007

External links

 Register of Sites of Special Scientific Interest (SSSIs) in Hong Kong
 WWF factsheet: Hong Kong Sites of Special Scientific Interest (Copy 1) (Copy 2)
 Map of the Site of Special Scientific Interest, updated in August 2010

Environment of Hong Kong
Natural history of Hong Kong